Louis-Philippe Beaubien (March 3, 1903 – March 28, 1985) was a Canadian politician.

Born in Montreal, Quebec, his father Charles-Philippe Beaubien was a Senator from 1919 to 1945 and his grandfather, Louis Beaubien, was a member of the National Assembly of Quebec and House of Commons of Canada.

He was a stockbroker and Progressive Conservative fund raiser before being summoned to the Senate in 1960 representing the senatorial division of Bedford, Quebec.

He died while in office in Ottawa, Ontario in 1985. He was entombed at the Notre Dame des Neiges Cemetery in Montreal.

References

External links
 

Beaubien-Casgrain family
1903 births
1985 deaths
Canadian senators from Quebec
Politicians from Montreal
Progressive Conservative Party of Canada senators
Burials at Notre Dame des Neiges Cemetery